The Valea Mare is a left tributary of the Râul Doamnei in Romania. It flows into the Râul Doamnei in Valea Mare-Podgoria.

References

Rivers of Romania
Rivers of Argeș County